Nam Ki-Il  (born August 17, 1974) is a South Korean former football player and current manager of Jeju United FC.

Club career 
He played for Bucheon SK, Jeonnam Dragons, Seongnam Ilhwa Chunma and Cheonan City FC.

Managerial career

Career statistics

Club

External links

 N-League Player Record - 남기일 

1974 births
Living people
Association football midfielders
South Korean footballers
South Korean football managers
Jeju United FC players
Jeonnam Dragons players
Seongnam FC players
K League 1 players
Korea National League players
Gwangju FC managers
Seongnam FC managers
People from Suncheon
Sportspeople from South Jeolla Province